Adelaide has a Mediterranean climate (Köppen climate classification Csa), with mild wet winters and hot dry summers.

Seasonal variation

In summer (December to February) the average minimum is around 15 to 17 °C and the average maximum is around 26 to 29 °C, but there is considerable variation and Adelaide can usually expect several days a year where temperatures reach the mid/high 30s to low 40s. On a few occasions the temperature has even nudged into the mid 40s. These high temperatures usually occur when hot northerly winds blow hot air down south from central Australia, causing the mercury to spike. However, the weather, like Melbourne, Victoria, can be rather changeable as it is not uncommon to have days where the temperature peaks in the low 20s when there is a cool southerly wind blowing cooler air from the Southern Ocean. Occasionally, the mercury may fail to get to 20 degrees, even in the peak of summer. In winter (June to August) the average maximum is around 14 to 16 °C and the average minimum around 7 to 9 °C, although temperatures again can fluctuate. Note though that the mercury rarely drops below freezing or rises above 19 °C. Frosts are common in the valleys of the Adelaide Hills, but rare elsewhere, with the most notable occurrences having occurred in July 1908 and July 1982. In winter, Adelaide experiences quite a significant wind chill, which makes the apparent temperature seem cooler than it actually is.

Rainfall is unreliable, light and infrequent throughout summer. The average in January and February is around 20mm (0.7 inches), but completely rainless months are by no means uncommon (latest being January 2019), and in 1893 sixty-nine days passed without measurable rainfall. In contrast, the winter has fairly reliable rainfall with June being the wettest month of the year, averaging around 80 mm. The city's dry summers is owed to the Australian High on the Great Australian Bight.

Climate data

Recorded extremes (records from West Tce weather station 1839–1977 and 2017–present, and Kent Town weather station 1977–2017):
Hottest temperature: , 24 January 2019  
Coldest temperature: , 8 June 1982
Hottest Minimum: , 29 January 2009 
Coldest Maximum: , 29 June 1922
Wettest month: , June 1916
Wettest 24 hours: , 7 February 1925

Extreme weather events: extreme temperatures, heatwaves, droughts (2007–)

February 2007: Average maximums not seen since 1906 
The average daily maximum temperature in Adelaide for February 2007 was 32.9 °C (91.2 °F), making it the second hottest on record only behind February 1906. The month included 15 days above 33 °C (91.4 °F) and 8 above 37 °C (98.6 °F). The warmest day was the 17th with a temperature of 41.5 °C (106.7 °F).

August 2007: Highest winter temperature ever 
On 30 August 2007, the mercury in the city hit 30.4 °C (86.7 °F) the first and only 30 °C plus temperature recorded ever in winter, quite unusual for that time of year.

March 2008 heatwave 

This heatwave is even more exceptional because it didn't occur in summer.

January–February 2009 heatwave

During January and February 2009 Adelaide was affected by the early 2009 southeastern Australia heat wave. The heatwave broke numerous records and affected all of south-eastern Australia, including Melbourne, where some outdoor games were cancelled during the 2009 Australian Open.

This is the longest straight run of  temperatures in Adelaide. On 28 January, the third day into the heatwave, the temperature reached , making it the third-hottest day on record in Adelaide.

November 2009 heatwave

In November 2009 Adelaide was affected by the late 2009 southeastern Australia heatwave which occurred in the states of South Australia, Victoria and New South Wales. Above-average temperatures in the region began in late October and persisted until mid-November 2009.

Temperature records for November in Adelaide set during the heatwave:

 8 consecutive days over  – new record set on 13 November, breaking the previous record of 4 consecutive days, which was set in 1894.
 6 consecutive days over  – breaking the previous record of 3 consecutive days, which was set in 1888, 1922 and 1984.
 Hottest November day –  on 19 November 2009 at 4:32pm ACDT, breaking the previous record of  set on 13 November 1993.

Summer 2013–2014 heatwave 

The summer of 2013–2014 was the second-hottest on record. Records for Adelaide set during the 2013–2014 summer heatwave (beginning in December) include:

 Hottest February day –  on 2 February 2014.
 Record number of days exceeding  during the summer months (December, January and February) – 13.
 Record number of days exceeding  during a calendar year – 10.
 Record number of consecutive days exceeding  – 5.

Autumn 2014: Above average temperatures for Adelaide 

Autumn 2014 was the fourth-warmest on record in South Australia, and included a record run of 16 consecutive days in May with maximum temperatures over 20 °C within the city and metro areas.

In the 15 days from the 11th to 25 May the average maximum temperature was 24 °C (75.2 °F), compared with the usual 18.5 °C (65.3 °F) for that time of year.

Spring 2015: hottest October on record and 2nd warmest spring on record 

October 2015 in Adelaide was the warmest on record for the city, continuing the trend of record breaking heat in the 2010s. The temperature was approximately  degrees above the long term average. Rainfall was also scarce for the month with only 9mm being recorded.

November was also warmer than usual with daytime temperatures averaging 27.5 °C (81.5 °F) and temperatures reaching 40 °C (104 °F) on the 18th, the second earliest ever. Spring 2015 daytime maximum temperatures ended up averaging 24.6 °C (76.3 °F), the second highest on record just falling short of 1914.

December 2015: Hottest December on record and second heatwave for the summer 
In early December, Adelaide experienced its hottest December night since 1897 and another heatwave–the temperature did not drop below  until 4am on 7 December.

Following one of Adelaide's hottest nights on record, in mid December 2015, temperatures soared above 40 °C (104 °F) for 4 consecutive days between the 16th and 19th, with the warmest being the 19th at 43.2 °C (109.8 °F). December 2015 ended up being the warmest on record with daily maximum temperatures averaging 32.5 °C (90.5 °F) and 7 days above 40 °C (104 °F). This continues the trend that Adelaide has experienced since the early 2000s of summer heat exceeding maximum temperatures and breaking records. The heatwave in December 2015 marked Adelaide's record of five heatwaves in six years.

March 2016 heatwave 
In early March, Adelaide endured 9 consecutive days in which the temperature reached above . Rain during this period increased the humidity level in the city, and flash flooding was recorded in the suburbs, as temperatures dropped back into the high 20s on 9 March.

15 of the first 17 days of March 2016 recorded temperatures above 30 °C (86 °F), the second half of the month was quite cooler though.

Hottest Christmas Day in 75 years and February 2017 heatwave
On 25 December 2016, Adelaide experienced its hottest Christmas Day since 1941. The mercury reached . That following February, a heatwave was recorded in Adelaide as the temperature climbed above  for 3 consecutive days, with the minimum overnight temperature not dropping below  on 9 February. Blackouts across the city complicated the conditions further.

Winter 2017: Equal lowest June rainfall in Adelaide's recorded history
Adelaide recorded its second driest June in recorded history, and the driest in 59 years. Less than 10mm fell in the entire month compared to the average of 71.2mm, with Adelaide city recording only 6mm, the equal lowest monthly rainfall total for any winter month in recorded history. Agricultural regions across South Australia were also affected, experiencing the third driest winter on record.

Summer 2017–2018: fourteen consecutive days above 30 degrees and various heatwaves
Summer 2017–18 was another hot summer for Adelaide. Beginning on 15 January 2018, the daytime temperature in Adelaide did not drop below  with forecasts of temperatures above  up until 29 January. The last day of this heatwave, the 28th, reached 41.8 °C (107.2 °F) at the Adelaide (West Terrace) observation station and 44.1 °C (111.4 °F) at the Adelaide (Kent Town) station, located on the eastern side of the city.

Exceptional Autumn Warmth - April 2018
Continuing the above average warmth of 2018, April 2018 was the second warmest of all time, with the average maximum temperature for the whole month being 26.6 °C (79.9 °F). Well above the usual 22.8 •C (73 °F). The unusual warmth also produced some of the highest April temperatures of all time, including a record equalling 36.9 °C (98.5 °F) on the 11th. The 9th and 10th were also exceptionally warm, registering 36.6 C° (97.9 F°) and 36.5 °C (97.7 °F) respectively.

New record Hottest Day – January 2019

January 2019 was also one of the warmest months on record with an average daily maximum temperature of 33 °C (91.4 °F).

January - April 2019: Driest start to a year in recent memory
The first four months of 2019 were exceptionally dry, with only 17.8mm falling in the four months combined. January was completely rainless, February had 6.6mm, March had 8mm and April had 3.2mm which is one of the driest of all time. Only 7 of the first 120 days of the year recorded over 1mm of rain with the highest daily total for the four months being 2.8mm on 13 February.

December 2019 Heatwave

Between 17 and 20 December 2019, the official Adelaide weather observation station (West Terrace) recorded 4 consecutive days above 42 °C (107.6 °F). This heatwave also produced the hottest December day and night on record, on the 19th the mercury hit 45.3 °C (113.6 °F) at the West Terrace station, the following night the temperature didn't drop below 33.6 °C (92.5 °F) making it the 2nd warmest night on record. On the Eastern side of town, the Adelaide (Kent Town) weather station recorded 3 consecutive 45 °C (113 °F) degree plus days.

In the second half of December 2019 (16th-31st) the average daily maximum was 36.4 °C (97.5 °F). This led to the whole month being the third warmest December on record for Adelaide.

August 2020 - Coldest August night on record
On the morning of 5 August 2020 the mercury at the Adelaide (West Terrace) station dropped to 0.8 °C (33.5 °F). This reading is the lowest ever in August and the equal 3rd lowest temperature in history at the West Terrace station.

November 2020 - 2nd hottest on record
November 2020 was actually the warmest November on record for the Adelaide (West Terrace) observation station, with an average daily maximum of 28.8 °C (83.9 °F). The month had 15 days above 30 °C (86 °F) and 11 above 33 °C (91.4 °F). It also was the warmest month of 2020 for average daily maximums, beating January by 0.1 °C.

The only other warmer November was in 2009 when the official weather observation station was Adelaide (Kent Town) not West Terrace.

See also
 Climate of Australia
 Climate change in Australia
 Extreme weather events
 Bushfires in Australia
 Effects of the El Niño–Southern Oscillation in Australia

Notes

References 

Adelaide
Adelaide
Environment of South Australia